Goh Hock Guan (9 September 1935 – 29 March 2018) was a Malaysian politician from Democratic Action Party (DAP) and Parti Gerakan Rakyat Malaysia (GERAKAN). He was the founder of the internationally acclaimed architectural firm Goh Hock Guan and Associates.

Political career 
He began his career with the Malayan chapter of the People's Action Party during the Singapore-Malaysia years. In the Malaysian General Election, 1964 he contested the Pantai state seat and lost his deposit.

He became one of the founding members of the Democratic Action Party after the separation where the PAP was deregistered, and was the DAP logo designer. He was elected as Secretary-General of the DAP after the resignation of then Secretary-General Devan Nair. He led the DAP in Malaysian General Election, 1969. The party won 13 parliamentary seats including his own win in Bangsar that incumbent DAP MP Nair had given up to him to return to Singapore.

He quit the DAP after falling out with his erstwhile deputy Lim Kit Siang and joined the Parti Gerakan Rakyat Malaysia in 1974, which was a component party in the Barisan Nasional coalition. When Bangsar was carved into Petaling and Damansara, Goh contested Petaling as a BN candidate, but lost to the DAP. Goh quit politics thereafter.

Achievements
Goh, who was also chairman and founder of Akitek Jururancang (Malaysia) Sdn Bhd, was responsible for building the iconic revolving restaurant at the Federal Hotel, which he designed to celebrate the country's independence in 1957.

His other designs include Mid Valley Megamall and Sunway Pyramid, and he did the town planning for major projects such as Subang Jaya, Putrajaya and the Kuala Lumpur International Airport.

Relationships with other leaders

He has friendships with political heavyweights such as Singapore's late founding father Lee Kuan Yew. Goh reportedly had the ear of former prime minister Tun Abdul Razak Hussein and was once courted to join Barisan Nasional, as they both believed in a multi-racial approach to politics.

Personal life 
Goh died on 29 March 2018 at the age of 82. He was cremated at Xiao En Crematorium in Nilai, Negri Sembilan.

Election results

References 

1935 births
2018 deaths
Malaysian architects
Malaysian politicians of Chinese descent
Former Democratic Action Party (Malaysia) politicians
Parti Gerakan Rakyat Malaysia politicians
Asian democratic socialists
Members of the Dewan Rakyat